Diphenyl diselenide is the chemical compound with the formula (C6H5)2Se2, abbreviated Ph2Se2.  This orange-coloured solid is the oxidized derivative of benzeneselenol.  It is used as a source of the PhSe unit in organic synthesis.

Preparation and properties 
Ph2Se2 is prepared by the oxidation of benzeneselenoate, the conjugate base of benzeneselenol which is generated via the Grignard reagent:

PhMgBr  +  Se  →  PhSeMgBr
2 PhSeMgBr  +  Br2  →  Ph2Se2  +  2 MgBr2

The molecule has idealized C2-symmetry, like hydrogen peroxide and related molecules. The Se-Se bond length of 2.29 Å the C-Se-Se-C dihedral angle is 82° and the C-Se-Se angles are near 110°.

Antioxidant action 
"Dietary supplementation with Ph2Se2 prevented CH3HgCl-induced locomotor impairment. This effect appeared to be mediated by antioxidant action. Ph2Se2 may be a viable approach to prevention or reduction CH3HgCl-mediated neurotoxic effects."

Reactions
A reaction characteristic of Ph2Se2 is its reduction:
Ph2Se2  +  2 Na  →  2 PhSeNa

PhSeNa is a useful nucleophile used to introduce the phenylselenyl group by nucleophilic substitution of alkyl halides, alkyl sulfonates (mesylates or tosylates) and epoxides. The example below was taken from a synthesis of morphine.

Another characteristic reaction is chlorination:
Ph2Se2  +  Cl2  →  2 PhSeCl

PhSeCl is a powerful electrophile, used to introduce PhSe groups by reaction with a variety of nucleophiles, including enolates, enol silyl ethers, Grignard reagents, organolithium reagents, alkenes and amines. In the sequence below (early steps in the synthesis of Strychnofoline), a PhSe group is introduced by reaction of a lactam enolate with PhSeCl. This sequence is a powerful method for the conversion of carbonyl compounds to their α,β-unsaturated analogs.

Diphenyl diselenide itself is also a source of a weakly electrophilic PhSe group in reactions with relatively powerful nucleophiles like Grignard reagents, lithium reagents and ester enolates (but not ketone enolates or weaker nucleophiles). PhSeCl is both more reactive, and more efficient, since with Ph2Se2 half of the selenium is wasted.

Ph2Se2  +  Nu− →  PhSeNu  +  PhSe−

N-Phenylselenophthalimide (N-PSP) can be used if PhSeCl is too strong and diphenyl diselenide is too weak or wasteful.

References

Organoselenium compounds
Phenyl compounds